Ceratophyllus nanshanensis is a species of flea in the family Ceratophyllidae. It was described by Liyuen, Fenchun and Chuan in 1980.

References 

Ceratophyllidae
Insects described in 1980